The Vice Chancellor of Lagos State University is the executive head of the University. Upon the VC's appointment by the Governor of Lagos State, the VC has the overall responsibility for the policy and administration of the University. The Governor of Lagos state appointed Professor Ibiyemi Olatunji-Bello as the  9th substantive Vice Chancellor of Lagos State University on 16 September 2021.

Vice-Chancellors
Folabi Olumide (1983–1988)
Jadesola Akande (1989–1993)
Enitan Bababunmi (1993–1996)
Fatiu Ademola Akesode (1997–2001)
Abisogun Leigh (2001–2005)
Abdul Lateef A. Hussein (2005–2011)
John Obafunwa (2011–2015)
Olanrewaju Fagbohun (2016–2021)
Ibiyemi Olatunji-Bello (2021–present)

References

Academic staff of Lagos State University
Education in Lagos
Vice-Chancellors of Lagos State University